François Amédée Doppet (16 March 1753 – 26 April 1799) was a Savoyard who briefly commanded three French armies during the French Revolutionary Wars without distinction. During the 1770s he enlisted in the French cavalry. Quitting the army after three years, he became a physician after studying medicine at Turin. Later moving to Paris, he became a writer of poems, romances and medical works while also dabbling in aphrodisiacs and mesmerism.

Doppet threw himself wholeheartedly into the French Revolution, was elected to the Legislative Assembly and became a Jacobin. Appointed commander of a volunteer battalion, he took part in the French invasion of Savoy in 1792. Rapidly promoted to general officer in 1793, the government appointed him to command the Army of the Alps in the Siege of Lyon, the army engaged in the Siege of Toulon and the Army of the Eastern Pyrenees. In no case did his time in command last long. During the last appointment he became ill and was replaced, though he was later employed as a division commander. The government used him because he was politically safe but it finally became clear that his military talent was almost non-existent. In 1797 he was elected to the Council of Five Hundred and he died two years later.

References

French generals
French military personnel of the French Revolutionary Wars
French Republican military leaders of the French Revolutionary Wars
Military leaders of the French Revolutionary Wars
People from Savoie
1753 births
1799 deaths